Joseph John O'Connell (1861 – 1959), 1st, was an electrical engineer and inventor. He worked for the Chicago Telephone Company (which began as the Chicago Bell Telephone, Co. in 1878 ) in the late 19th and early 20th centuries. He had many inventions including the circuit breaker and the coin return. He also created the "invisible wire" which was the first time more than one telephone conversation could occur on the same wire. Reference to some additional inventions are mentioned in Angus Hibbard's autobiography, Hello- Goodbye  including an electric lamp as a signal in a burglar-alarm operated by the telephone company in 1886.

Inventions 
O'Connell's inventions include:
 Telephone exchange apparatus, US Patent No. 417,271, dated Dec 17, 1889
 Testing apparatus for telephone exchange switches, US Patent No. 420,091, patented January 28, 1890
 Telephone-exchange apparatus, US Patent No. 430,747, dated June 24, 1890
 Telephone-exchange key board apparatus, US Patent No. 430,748, dated June 24, 1890.
 Metallic circuit test and time signal for telephone exchanges, US Patent No. 454,016, dated June 9, 1891
 Telephone switching apparatus and circuit, US Patent No. 533,015, dated January 22, 1894
 Switch and circuit for telephone exchanges, US Patent No. 515,531, dated Feb 27, 1894
 Signaling apparatus for telephone exchange circuits, US Patent No. 587,226, dated July 30, 1895
 Telephone exchange apparatus, US Patent No. 544,901, dated Aug 20,1895
 Signaling circuit, US Patent No. 555,707, dated Mar 3, 1896 (reissued Oct 20, 1897)
 Telephone trunk circuit, US Patent No. 587,226, dated July 27, 1897
 Signaling apparatus for telephone switchboards, US Patent No.652,977, dated July 3, 1900
 Apparatus for telephone switchboards, US patent No. 645,758, dated July 31, 1900
 Calling apparatus for party telephone-lines, US patent No. 647,515, dated May 21, 1901
 Coin collector for telephone toll lines, US Patent No. 704,268, dated July 8, 1902
 Cable terminal, US Patent No. 727, 829, dated May 12, 1903
 Telephone exchange system, US Patent No. 730,291, dated June 9, 1903
 Busy test apparatus for telephone switchboards, US Patent No. 736,002, dated Aug 11, 1903
 Earth or ground wire attachment, US Patent No. 762,341, dated June 14, 1904
 Apparatus for amplifying or reinforcing telephone currents, US Patent No, 760,143, dated May 17, 1904

Family 
Grandson, Joseph John O'Connell 3rd, was a sculptor, print maker, photographer, artist-in-residence and teacher at CSB/SJU from 1962 to 1995.

References

American inventors
1861 births
1959 deaths